The FATA Development Authority was a regulatory development organisation which executed construction and development projects in former FATA region, Pakistan. Based in Peshawar, the body was chaired by the Governor of Khyber Pakhtunkhwa.

History
The FDA was established in 2007 as a result of the ongoing War in North-West Pakistan. The region, affected by terrorism, was experiencing a downfall of infrastructure. There was hence an incentive from the President of Pakistan to propose an organisation which would "restructure the administrative and developmental regime in FATA" as well as tackle poverty.

In the financial year 2009-10, the FDA announced a focus development program where it would spend 1.15 billion rupees on 44 development schemes in eight designated sectors. The statement was made during a meeting presided by several committee members, including the provincial governor, Owais Ahmed Ghani. Additional proposals were made for the future construction of several dams and solar energy projects in FATA.

In August 2019, the Government of Khyber Pakhtunkhwa dissolved the authority after FATA merger.

See also
 Administrative System of the Federally Administered Tribal Areas

References

External links
 Official website
 FATA Development Authority  - World Security Network
 FATA Development Authority

Federally Administered Tribal Areas
2019 disestablishments in Pakistan